Sharan (Şaran) is a rural locality (a selo) and the administrative center of Sharansky District of the Republic of Bashkortostan, Russia. Population:

References

Rural localities in Sharansky District